The Dornoch Firth Bridge is a road bridge over the Dornoch Firth, carrying traffic between Tain and Dornoch.

History
It was built for the Scottish Office. There had been recent substantial improvements of the A9 between Inverness and Tain, including the cable-stayed Kessock Bridge at Inverness in 1982. The Dornoch Bridge was to be the final link in the chain. Tenders were open to bid from 1986, and 40 companies showed an interest in the contract. Ove Arup and Crouch Hogg Waterman of Glasgow produced a set of initial design parameters for companies to build. The joint-venture chosen to build the bridge put in a quote for £9.5 million, and won the contract in early 1988. There were proposals that the bridge should be constructed so as to allow the Far North railway line to benefit from the shorter route as well, with the potential for up to 45 minutes to be saved on the journey between Inverness and Thurso/Wick. However this part of the scheme failed to secure government funding, and so only a road bridge was built.

Design
The Project Manager was Nigel Beaney of Christiani & Nielsen. Prestressed concrete rather than steel was chosen as the material to improve the life of the bridge. The design had to be approved by the Royal Fine Art Commission for Scotland.

Construction

It was built by a joint venture of Christiani & Nielsen. It cost £13.5 million (£ million current value). At the time it was one of the longest bridges in Europe built with the cast-and-push method, or incremental launch.

The bridge deck was built in a temporary factory 20 metres south of the southern end of the bridge. The launch nose section had a light steel composition to reduce the cantilever moment as it was inched over an open span. The concrete used welded mat reinforcement. The pre-stressing of each section had 38 Macalloy bar tendons of 40 mm thickness. The sections would be cast on a Monday morning and pushed on a Friday, this later being on a Thursday.

Opening

The bridge was opened by The Queen Mother on Tuesday, 27 August 1991. It replaced, via a roundabout with the A836 to the south and a road junction with the A949 to the north, the  round trip over Bonar Bridge.

See also
 Cromarty Bridge, further to the south.

References

External links
 SABRE Roads
 Scottish Places
 Construction

Video clips
 Sailing under the bridge

1991 establishments in Scotland
Box girder bridges in the United Kingdom
Bridges completed in 1991
Bridges in Highland (council area)
Buildings and structures in Sutherland
Concrete bridges in the United Kingdom
Road bridges in Scotland